Anna Köhler  is a German physicist who is a Professor of Physics at the University of Bayreuth. Her research considers electronic processes in organic and organometallic molecules. She makes use of optical and electrical spectroscopy to better understand photo-physical processes. In 2020 she became the first woman to win the Max Born Medal and Prize.

Early life and education 

Köhler is from Germany. She enrolled in 1989 at the Karlsruhe Institute of Technology for her undergraduate studies, where she studied physics and mathematics. In 1992, Köhler moved to the Faculty of Mathematics at the University of Cambridge.

Research and career 
Köhler was appointed Professor of Physics and Chair of Soft Matter Optoelectronics at the University of Bayreuth in 2007. Her research considers organic semiconducting materials for solar cells and light-emitting diodes. In particular, Köhler has studied the spin states of organic semiconductors. Köhler was made executive director of the Bayreuth University Centre of International Excellence in 2019.

She is the lead of a Horizon 2020 international training network on thermally activated delayed fluorescence (TADF) OLEDs. She is interested in the photophysicsal processes leading to bright OLEDs, as well as in those making organic solar cells more efficient.

Awards and honours 

 1989 Fulbright Program Scholarship
 1999 Royal Society University Research Fellowship
 2019 Alexander Todd - Hans Krebs lectureship
 2020 Max Born Medal and Prize

Selected publications

Books

References 

Living people
Year of birth missing (living people)
Women physicists
University of Bayreuth alumni
Alumni of the University of Cambridge
Experimental physicists
Fellows of the Royal Society of Chemistry